Beaubien may refer to:

 Beaubien (surname)
 Beaubien House, headquarters of the Michigan Architectural Foundation
 Beaubien Street, a street in Montreal
 Beaubien station, on the Orange Line of the Montreal Metro rapid transit system
 Beaubien Camp, a location in the Boy Scout Philmont Scout Ranch in New Mexico